Committee on Home-School Co-operation (CHSC) is an advisory committee serving the Education Department promoting interaction between parents and schools by promoting the creation of parent-teacher associations (PTAs) as well as giving grants, establishing training materials and surveys, and promoting improvements of ties between families and the schools that serve their children. Nora Tong of the South China Morning Post described it as a "semi-governmental" organisation.

History
The CHSC was established in 1993. The Education Department Report No. 5, issued in 1992, recommended the creation of the CHSC.

In 2002–2003, in Hong Kong, there were over 1,395 parent-teacher associations, while the number in 1992 was around 70; this outcome was promoted though the establishment of CHSC.

References

Further reading
 Choi, Alfred and Tit Wing Lo. Fighting Youth Crime: Success and Failure of Two Little Dragons. Times Academic Press, 2002. , 9789812101945. p. 164-165. See snippet at Google Books

External links
 Committee on Home-School Co-operation
 Committee on Home-School Co-operation 

Education in Hong Kong
1993 establishments in Hong Kong